Madison Albers is an Australian cricketer who currently plays for Victoria in the Women's National Cricket League (WNCL). She plays as a right-arm medium bowler.

Domestic career
Albers plays grade cricket for Carlton Cricket Club.

In the summer of 2022, Albers took part in Renegades Recruit, a reality television show run by Melbourne Renegades to uncover new cricketing talent. In January 2023, Albers made her debut for Victoria, taking 1/24 from six overs against Queensland in the Women's National Cricket League.

References

External links

Living people
Date of birth missing (living people)
Year of birth missing (living people)
Place of birth missing (living people)
Australian women cricketers
Victoria women cricketers